Acacia torringtonensis is a shrub belonging to the genus Acacia and the subgenus Phyllodineae native to eastern Australia.

Description
It has smooth, grey to black–coloured bark on the main trunk and limbs with terete, densely hair branchlets. Like most species of Acacia it has phyllodes rather than true leaves. The evergreen phyllodes appear whorled or in clusters and have a linear to narrowly elliptic shape and are usually slightly curved or less frequently straight. It blooms between August and September producing yellow flowers.

Taxonomy
The species was first formally described by the botanist Mary Tindale in 1975 as part of the work Notes on Australian taxa of Acacia as published in the journal Telopea.
The specific epithet is in reference to the town of Torrington from near where the type specimen was collected. The species is closely related to Acacia ruppii.

Distribution
It is endemic to a small area in north western New South Wales at the border with Queensland in the Wallangarra district where it is found among granite outcrops as a part of heath or dry sclerophyll forest communities.

See also
 List of Acacia species

References

torringtonensis
Flora of New South Wales
Plants described in 1975